Mulberry River Bridge may refer to:

Mulberry River Bridge (Pleasant Hill, Arkansas), listed on the NRHP in Arkansas
Mulberry River Bridge (Turner's Bend, Arkansas), listed on the NRHP in Arkansas

See also 
Mulberry River (disambiguation)
Mulberry Fork River (disambiguation)